Nanhai District, is a district of Foshan, Guangdong, China. Its government is the first to have developed e-government informatization at the county level in China.

History 
Establishment of Nanhai is traditionally attributed two brothers carrying their father's bowls in 1271. They were fleeing south from the Mongols on a bamboo raft when a violent storm shipwrecked them and broke all the bowls. The brothers settled down there and the position of the wreck is commemorated by a shrine. This area was named Broken Bowls Point.

On 15 February 1921, the eastern part of Nanhai County was ceded to the newly established City of Guangzhou which became part of what is now western part of Liwan. On 26 June 1951, Foshan Town (present Chancheng) was ceded to the newly established City of Foshan. Nanhai County was upgraded into a county-level city on 2 September 1992 until 8 December 2002 Nanhai was consolidated as a district of Foshan.

Administration division
Nanhai was a county-level city until December 8, 2002, when it became a district of Foshan prefecture-level city.

E-government
Nanhai was designated by the central government as a pilot city for e-government and informatization in 2001.

Notable people
 Kang Tongbi
 Kang Youwei
 Lin Liang
 Wong Fei Hung
 Ip Man
 Tony Leung Ka-fai
 Antonio Ng
 Tan Sri Datuk Amar Stephen Kalong Ningkan
 Zhan Tianyou
 Zhong Naixiong

See also
Nanhai Experimental High School
Nenking Group

References

External links

 Mango Kwan's site contains pictures and history 

 
County-level divisions of Guangdong
Foshan